Protein G6b is a protein that in humans is encoded by the G6B gene, or C6orf25.

This gene is a member of the immunoglobulin (Ig) superfamily and is located in the major histocompatibility complex (MHC) class III region. The protein encoded by this gene is a glycosylated, plasma membrane-bound cell surface receptor, but soluble isoforms encoded by some transcript variants have been found in the endoplasmic reticulum and Golgi before being secreted. Multiple transcript variants encoding different isoforms have been found for this gene.

References

Further reading